Abdullah Al-Abbas (born 30 January 1992) is a Saudi Arabian handball player for Al-Noor and the Saudi Arabia national team.

References

1992 births
Living people
Saudi Arabian male handball players
Place of birth missing (living people)
Handball players at the 2014 Asian Games
Handball players at the 2018 Asian Games
Asian Games competitors for Saudi Arabia
20th-century Saudi Arabian people
21st-century Saudi Arabian people